Navia is one of eight parishes (administrative divisions) in Navia, a municipality within the province and autonomous community of Asturias, in northern Spain.

Parishes in Navia